Mátyás Magos (born 14 March 1992) is a Hungarian football (midfielder) player who currently plays for Balassagyarmati VSE.

Club career
He became a first squad member at Újpest FC in 2011.

External links

hlsz.hu 

1992 births
Living people
Footballers from Budapest
Hungarian footballers
Association football midfielders
Balassagyarmati SE footballers
Újpest FC players
Szolnoki MÁV FC footballers
Vác FC players
Nemzeti Bajnokság I players